Very Best of No Angels is a compilation album by German pop group No Angels. It was released by Polydor Records and Universal Music on 27 May 2008 in most European territories (excluding Austria, Germany, and Switzerland), following the group's participation in the Eurovision Song Contest 2008 in Belgrade, Serbia.

Track listing

Best of EP

References

External links
 NoAngels-Music.de — official website

No Angels albums
2008 greatest hits albums
Polydor Records compilation albums